is a Japanese former professional wrestler. He started his career in All Japan Pro Wrestling (AJPW) in 1988, where he became one of the promotion's top stars, holding the Triple Crown Heavyweight Championship three times, and winning the Champion Carnival in 2000. Kobashi left All Japan in June 2000, taking part in a mass exodus led by Mitsuharu Misawa, which led to the formation of Pro Wrestling Noah. Kobashi worked for Noah for thirteen years, and became the longest reigning GHC Heavyweight Champion of all time, holding the championship for 735 days between 2003 and 2005, a record that stands to this day. He was a four-time world champion.

Kobashi spent many of the later years of his career sidelined due to various injuries.  He underwent numerous surgeries on his arms and legs in the early-mid 2000s before retiring from in-ring action in May 2013. Kobashi continues to make sporadic appearances in both Noah and All Japan, while also promoting his own shows under the Fortune Dream banner.

Professional wrestling career

All Japan Pro Wrestling (1988–2000, 2009) 
Kobashi practiced judo and rugby union during high school in Fukuchiyama. He practised body building after his graduation while working "regular" jobs. He applied and was accepted to All Japan Pro Wrestling's (AJPW) dojo on June 20, 1987. He was trained there by Dory Funk Jr., Giant Baba, Kazuharu Sonoda and Masanobu Fuchi. Kobashi debuted as a professional wrestler in Ryūō, Shiga on February 26, 1988. He was booked by Shohei "Giant" Baba to lose his first 63 matches (all singles bouts). It was all part of Baba's master plan: even in defeat, the fiery, charismatic Kobashi shined and his gutsy, never-say-die efforts earned him the Rookie of the Year award from the Japanese press. Kobashi won his first match in May 1989 (against Jim Crockett Promotions jobber Mitch Snow). During 1989, when The Road Warriors were in AJPW, they taught Kobashi the "Road Warrior Workout". He first gained some prominence as member of Mitsuharu Misawa's faction during Misawa's feud with Jumbo Tsuruta.

Kobashi during this period played dual roles according to who his partners and opponents were. When teamed with the higher ranking Misawa or Toshiaki Kawada, Kobashi would play the gutsy underdog. At the same time, when teamed with the much smaller Tsuyoshi Kikuchi, he would play a "big brother" role, coming in to try to save the day after Kikuchi had been worked on for a while by the opponents. Eleven months later he won his first title, the All Asia Tag Team Championship with Tiger Mask II (Misawa); however, shortly after removing the mask, Kobashi and Misawa would vacate the title. Over the next two years, Kobashi held the All Asia belts with Johnny Ace twice and with Kikuchi once. The title win with Kikuchi over Dan Kroffat and Doug Furnas took place before a rabid crowd in Kikuchi's hometown of Sendai on May 25, 1992; the match quickly gained legendary status among tape-traders, and was voted 1992's Match of the Year by the Wrestling Observer Newsletter.

In 1993, he became Misawa's main tag partner in the middle of the year when Kawada became Misawa's main rival. He gained his first singles victory over a former Triple Crown Heavyweight Champion, when he defeated Terry Gordy in May of that year. On December 3, 1993, Kobashi gained his first pin over Kawada, won his first World's Strongest Tag Determination League, and won his first World Tag Team Championship. Kobashi received his first shot at the Triple Crown Championship against then-champion Steve Williams on September 3, 1994, but lost at Nippon Budokan, Tokyo. Kobashi's singles matches around this time with Kawada, Misawa and Stan Hansen are amongst his most highly regarded. In tag competition he had strong efforts with opponents as diverse as rookie Jun Akiyama to elderly legend and promotion owner Giant Baba. Over the next few years Kobashi continued to gain more honors, but his position in the company did not truly change. In the 1994 Champion Carnival he gained his first singles victory over Hansen. His next title challenge was against Kawada in January 1995. This led to a 60-minute time limit draw, and is regarded as the greatest 60 minute bout in wrestling history by the Wrestling Observer Newsletter. On June 9, 1995, Kobashi and Misawa lost the tag title to Akira Taue and Toshiaki Kawada. The match is also notable because it won the best match of the year award from Tokyo Sports. He suffered the first of many knee injuries in mid 1995, but worked through it. In the early part of 1996 the company elevated Jun Akiyama by making him Misawa's main tag partner. While this was good for Akiyama and lead to some fresh tag matches, it left Kobashi without a real tag partner for most of the year, mostly having partnerships between The Patriot, Johnny Ace, where the trio was called G.E.T ("Global, Energetic & Tough") and rookie Hawaiian wrestler, Maunakea Mossman.

Kobashi defeated Akira Taue on July 24, 1996, to capture his first Triple Crown. He lost the championship to Misawa on January 20, 1997, in a very highly regarded match. In March 1997 in the Champion Carnival he gained his first pinfall victory over Misawa. At the end of the Carnival, Kobashi qualified for the finals for the first time. However, instead of the traditional one on one contest to settle the carnival, a one night 3 way round robin was held due to Kobashi, Kawada, and Misawa all having finished the Carnival round robin with the same score. In the first match Kobashi went to a 30-minute draw with Misawa. However, this match left both men greatly weakened and Kawada was able to quickly gain his first singles pin over Misawa in the next match that gave Kobashi little time to rest. In the final match Kawada defeated Kobashi to gain his second Carnival title. In October 1997 Kobashi won his first World Tag title without Misawa when he and Johnny Ace defeated Gary Albright and Steve Williams. In the same month he challenged Misawa for the Triple Crown in another memorable match, but again Misawa defeated him. While Kawada would finally end his quest to defeat Misawa for the Triple Crown at AJPW's May Tokyo Dome show called AJPW 25th Anniversary, in 1998, Kobashi would replace Kawada as Misawa's top rival. On June 12, 1998, Kobashi defeated Kawada to begin his second Triple Crown reign. Shortly before his victory he again suffered a major knee injury which he would not give time to heal, which nearly ended his career, and during that time, Johnny Ace turned heel on Kobashi to form his own stable called "The Movement". He lost the championship again to Misawa on October 31.

The year of 1998 would end with Kobashi gaining another career milestone as he with Akiyama, teaming as "Burning", captured his first World's Strongest Tag Determination League championship. As January began Kobashi was kicking off a new rivalry against Vader. He won the World's Strongest Tag Determination League again with Akiyama in December 1999. In February 2000 he defeated Vader to earn his third Triple Crown reign. Then in April 2000 he won his first Champion Carnival while in the course of the tournament gaining his first televised singles victory over Misawa. In mid-2000 Misawa left the company to form Pro Wrestling Noah; Kobashi, along with all but three All Japan native workers, followed Misawa. He was the reigning Triple Crown champion at the time, and the championship was thus vacated.

On August 30, 2009, Kobashi returned to All Japan Pro Wrestling for one night only, competing in his first match for the company in nine years. Kobashi teamed with Akihiko Ito and fellow AJPW alumnus Tsuyoshi Kikuchi in a losing effort to Satoshi Kojima, KAI and Hiroshi Yamato at Pro Wrestling Love in Ryogoku, Volume 8.

Pro Wrestling Noah (2000–2013) 
During this period, Kobashi's knee injuries were beginning to worsen to the point that he desperately needed time off to heal. However, he was needed to establish Noah as a viable promotion, and was given a marquee position on the first two shows. On August 5, 2000, he teamed with Akiyama to defeat Misawa and Taue in a two out of three falls match in the main event of the promotion's first show, and then lost to Akiyama on the second show the next day (Kobashi legitimately passed out while being captured in Akiyama's "King Crab Lock" submission and was unable to finish the match). Noah struggled to organize itself without any titles during this period. At the biggest Noah show of the year on December 23, 2000, Kobashi defeated Akiyama, avenging his loss earlier that year. Unfortunately for Kobashi the next month his knees finally deteriorated to the point he could no longer work through the pain and he was forced to take 13 months off for healing. He went through multiple knee surgeries during this time.

His return match was on February 24, 2002, and featured Kobashi reforming his pairing with Misawa to face Akiyama and New Japan Pro-Wrestling's (NJPW) Yuji Nagata. His knees again gave out on him during the match. After taking another five months to recuperate he returned and Noah began to slowly build towards him winning their top prize, the GHC Heavyweight Championship.

On March 1, 2003, Kobashi defeated his rival Mitsuharu Misawa in a match for the GHC Heavyweight Championship. Kobashi's reign spanned for over two years and included 13 successful defenses. Notable defences included: against Masahiro Chono at New Japan's May 2, 2003, Tokyo Dome event, against Yuji Nagata on September 12, 2003, against Yoshihiro Takayama on April 25, 2004, and against Jun Akiyama in the main event of Noah's first Tokyo Dome show on July 10, 2004. During his reign he won the Wrestling Observer Newsletter's Wrestler of the Year award in both 2003 and 2004. In March 2005 he finally lost the championship to Takeshi Rikio. Despite the loss of his title Kobashi remained Noah's top wrestler, the rest of the year was highlighted by matches with outsiders such as Genichiro Tenryu and Kensuke Sasaki (the latter on July 18, 2005, in the Tokyo Dome), and in the following year he had praised matches against junior heavyweights such as KENTA (March 5, 2006) and Naomichi Marufuji (April 23, 2006). Kobashi holds the distinction of having competed in a total of 23 5-Star Matches as rated by Dave Meltzer of the Wrestling Observer, second only to his long-time rival, Misawa.

In late 2005, Kobashi made his first appearance in North America with Harley Race's World League Wrestling promotion, defeating then WLW champion Wild Wade Chism. His second and third North American appearances were for Ring of Honor, where he defeated Samoa Joe in a memorable singles match (given a full 5-stars by the Wrestling Observer as well as their Match of the Year award for 2005), and teamed with Homicide to defeat the tag team of Low Ki and Samoa Joe. Kobashi also traveled to Europe, where he had matches in Germany, and at Universal Uproar in England, in November 2005. After winning the GHC Tag Team Championship on June 4, 2006, Kobashi became inactive in the sport due to cancer, resulting in his partner Tamon Honda returning the belts on September 26, 2006. On December 10, at the Nippon Budokan, Kobashi appeared before the fans and announced that he would return "without fail".

On September 8, 2007, news broke that Kobashi would make his return on the December 2, 2007, Budokan Hall event where he would team up with Takayama to face Akiyama and Misawa. On the card, Misawa would pin Kobashi with an avalanche Emerald Flowsion, but the fans still gave Kobashi a rousing ovation.

In September 2008, Kobashi underwent emergency surgery on both of his arms. The surgery was successful, and Kobashi was expected to make a full recovery. Kobashi was expected to be out of action for up to a year, but he would return to the ring less than six months later. Prior to returning to the ring, Kobashi stated that he wanted to start in opening matches, and rebuild himself to a main event player.

Kenta Kobashi made his return to wrestling on March 1, 2009, at Nippon Budokan with Pro Wrestling Noah, defeated Masao Inoue in the opening match of the card with his signature lariat. Kobashi won the GHC Openweight Hardcore Championship from Makoto Hashi on June 8, 2009, in Hachiōji, Japan during Noah's Southern Navigation tour.

On December 23, 2009, Kobashi was seriously injured in a three-way match against Honda and Kikuchi. He was sidelined for 19 months with nerve damage in his right arm. Kobashi made his return on July 23, 2011, teaming with Go Shiozaki in a tag team match, where they were defeated by Akitoshi Saito and Jun Akiyama. On August 27, 2011, he debuted new ring gear, mixing black and orange, at the NJPW/AJPW/Noah All Together show at Budokan Hall, teaming up with AJPW's Keiji Mutoh, defeating NJPW's Takashi Iizuka and Toru Yano. On October 6, it was announced by Noah that Kobashi had stepped down from his position as an Executive Vice President of the promotion. On December 3, 2012, Noah released Kobashi from his contract. The news sparked shockwaves, as Atsushi Aoki, Go Shiozaki, Jun Akiyama, Kotaro Suzuki, and Yoshinobu Kanemaru spoke out, declaring their intent of not signing with Noah after their contracts expire in January, out of loyalty to Kobashi.

On December 9, 2012, Kobashi attended Noah's Ryōgoku Kokugikan event and during an in-ring interview, revealed he planned to retire in a Noah ring in 2013. Noah and Kobashi seemingly came to an agreement to let him retire as opposed to forcing him to leave the promotion. Despite this change in plans, Noah confirmed on December 19 that Akiyama, Shiozaki, Suzuki, Kanemaru and Aoki all would be leaving the promotion after December 24. On January 23, 2013, Kobashi announced that his retirement match would take place on at Nippon Budokan. Kobashi's retirement event, Final Burning in Budokan took place on May 11. His retirement ceremony was held after the second match on the show and was attended by former Japanese Prime Minister Yoshihiko Noda, legendary NTV announcers Akira Fukuzawa and Kazuo Tokumitsu, former colleagues Akira Taue, Hiroshi Hase, Masahiro Chono, Mitsuo Momota, Toshiaki Kawada, and Stan Hansen via video message, along with many others. In the main event, Kobashi teamed with Jun Akiyama, Keiji Mutoh, and Kensuke Sasaki in an eight-man tag team match, where they defeated his protégés Go Shiozaki, Kenta, Maybach Taniguchi, and Yoshinobu Kanemaru, with Kobashi pinning Kanemaru with a moonsault for the final win of his career. The event at Nippon Budokan was attended by 17,000 fans and aired live across Japan on the television network BS Sky! and in movie theaters.

Post-retirement (2013–present) 
On March 17, 2013, Kobashi made an appearance for All Japan Pro Wrestling to promote his retirement match. Before the main event, Hiroshi Hase announced that he would be resigning as Pacific Wrestling Federation (PWF) chairman to focus on the National Diet and that Kobashi would be replacing him, after his retirement on May 11. On September 8, Kobashi appeared as a color commentator at All Japan splinter promotion Wrestle-1's inaugural event. On October 27, it was confirmed that Kobashi would not be joining All Japan after all, when Dory Funk Jr. was announced as the new PWF chairman.

On February 14, 2014, Kobashi announced that starting June 8, he would begin producing his own independent events under the brand "Fortune Dream". The inaugural event featured wrestlers from various promotions, including All Japan Pro Wrestling, Big Japan Pro Wrestling, Kaientai Dojo, Pro Wrestling Zero1 and Wrestling New Classic.

On May 10, 2015, Kobashi returned to Noah to serve as a "special witness" for a GHC Heavyweight Championship match between champion Minoru Suzuki and challenger Naomichi Marufuji. Kobashi's role included making sure that the Suzuki-gun stable did not interfere in the match.

Personal life 
Kobashi married his girlfriend of 14 years, singer Mizuki Mai, on October 2, 2010. In August 2015, Mai gave birth to the couple's first child, a daughter.

Legacy
Kobashi has the second-most 5-star matches (as rated by the Wrestling Observer Newsletter) with 23, two behind Mitsuharu Misawa's 25. In 2002, he was inducted by Dave Meltzer into the Wrestling Observer Newsletter Hall of Fame as the third inductee of the 2002 and the 148th inductee for his accomplishments in All Japan Pro Wrestling. For his last match on May 11, 2013, he was presented a replica of the GHC Heavyweight Championship belt as a farewell gift after his retirement match at Final Burning. He held the GHC Heavyweight Championship for a total of 735 days (the longest time held by any one competitor) with the second most successful defenses with 13.

Championships and accomplishments 
 All Japan Pro Wrestling
 All Asia Tag Team Championship (4 times) – with Tiger Mask II/Mitsuharu Misawa (1), Johnny Ace (2), and Tsuyoshi Kikuchi (1)
 Triple Crown Heavyweight Championship (3 times)
 World Tag Team Championship (6 times) – with Mitsuharu Misawa (2), Johnny Ace (2), and Jun Akiyama (2)
 Champion Carnival (2000)
 January 2 Korakuen Hall Heavyweight Battle Royal (1993)
 One Night Six Man Tag Team Tournament (1999) – with Jun Akiyama and Kentaro Shiga
 World's Strongest Tag Determination League (1993–1995) – with Mitsuharu Misawa
 World's Strongest Tag Determination League (1998, 1999) – with Jun Akiyama
 World's Strongest Tag Determination League Fresh Award (1991) – with Tsuyoshi Kikuchi
Nikkan Sports
Match of the Year (1997) vs. Mitsuharu Misawa on October 21
Match of the Year (1998) vs. Mitsuharu Misawa on October 31
Match of the Year (2003) vs. Mitsuharu Misawa on March 1
Match of the Year (2004) vs. Jun Akiyama on July 10
Match of the Year (2005) vs. Kensuke Sasaki on July 18
Match of the Year (2007) with Yoshihiro Takayama vs. Mitsuharu Misawa and Jun Akiyama on December 2
Outstanding Performance Award (1996)
Fighting Spirit Award (1997, 2007, 2008)
Wrestler of the Year (1996, 1998, 2004, 2005)
 Pro Wrestling Illustrated
 Ranked No. 4 of the top 500 singles wrestlers in the PWI 500 in 1996, 2000, and 2004
 Ranked No. 33 of the top 500 singles wrestlers of the "PWI Years" in 2003
 Ranked No. 6 of the top 100 tag teams of the "PWI Years" with Mitsuharu Misawa in 2003
 Pro Wrestling Noah
 GHC Heavyweight Championship (1 time)
 GHC Openweight Hardcore Championship (1 time)
 GHC Tag Team Championship (2 times) – with Tamon Honda
 One Day Six Man Tag Team Tournament (2002) – with Kenta and Kentaro Shiga
 Tokyo Sports
 Comeback Award (2007)
 Lifetime Achievement Award (2013)
 Match of the Year (1995) with Mitsuharu Misawa vs. Akira Taue and Toshiaki Kawada on June 9, 1995
 Match of the Year (1997) vs. Mitsuharu Misawa on October 21, 1997
 Match of the Year (1998) vs. Mitsuharu Misawa on October 31, 1998
 Match of the Year (2003) vs. Mitsuharu Misawa on March 1, 2003
 Match of the Year (2004) vs. Jun Akiyama on July 10, 2004
 Match of the Year (2005) vs. Kensuke Sasaki on July 18, 2005
 Match of the Year (2007) with Yoshihiro Takayama vs. Mitsuharu Misawa and Jun Akiyama on December 2, 2007
 Match of the Year (2011) with Keiji Mutoh vs. Takashi Iizuka and Toru Yano, All Together, August 27
 Rookie of the Year (1989)
 Tag Team of the Year (1993, 1994) with Mitsuharu Misawa
 Tag Team of the Year (1999) with Jun Akiyama
 Wrestler of the Year (1996, 1998)
 Wrestling Observer Newsletter
 Best Box Office Draw (2004, 2005)
 Best Wrestling Maneuver (1998) Burning Hammer
 Match of the Year (1992) with Tsuyoshi Kikuchi vs. Doug Furnas and Phil Lafon on May 25
 Match of the Year (1998) vs. Mitsuharu Misawa on October 31
 Match of the Year (1999) vs Mitsuharu Misawa on June 11
 Match of the Year (2003) vs. Mitsuharu Misawa on March 1
 Match of the Year (2004) vs. Jun Akiyama on July 10
 Match of the Year (2005) vs. Samoa Joe on October 1 at Joe vs. Kobashi
 Most Improved Wrestler (1990)
 Most Outstanding Wrestler (1993, 1994)
 Tag Team of the Year (1995) with Mitsuharu Misawa
 Tag Team of the Year (1999) with Jun Akiyama
 Wrestler of the Year (1996, 2003–2005)
 Wrestling Observer Newsletter Hall of Fame (Class of 2002)

References

External links
 Profile at Puroresufan.com
 View from the Rising Sun - "Orange Crush" Kenta Kobashi
 
 

1967 births
Japanese male professional wrestlers
Living people
Japanese bodybuilders
Japanese rugby union players
Sportspeople from Kyoto Prefecture
Professional wrestling executives
Japanese male judoka
GHC Heavyweight Champions
GHC Openweight Hardcore Champions
GHC Tag Team Champions
All Asia Tag Team Champions
World Tag Team Champions (AJPW)
Triple Crown Heavyweight Champions